Ed DeGeorge (born 1942) is a former American football player and coach. He served as the head football coach at Beloit College in Beloit, Wisconsin from 1977 to 2005, compiling a record of 135–136–1.

References

External links
 Wisconsin Football Coaches Association profile

1942 births
Living people
Beloit Buccaneers football coaches
Colorado College Tigers football coaches
Colorado College Tigers football players
People from Butte, Montana
Players of American football from Montana